The Eagle Lake and West Branch Railroad was a forest railway built to transfer pulpwood between drainage basins in the Maine North Woods. The railroad operated only a few years in a location so remote the steam locomotives were never scrapped and remain exposed to the elements at the site of the Eagle Lake Tramway. Its tracks were located in Penobscot County and Piscataquis County.

History
Spruce forests of the Maine North Woods were a source of pulpwood throughout the 20th century. Trees were bucked into  lengths and loaded onto sleds towed by draft animals or log haulers to the nearest river or lake. Log drives would float the pulpwood logs to a downstream paper mill when the snow and ice melted.  Pulpwood harvested in the upper Allagash River drainage was destined for Great Northern Paper Company paper mill on the West Branch Penobscot River in Millinocket. The problem was getting the pulpwood out of the north-flowing Allagash River into the east-flowing Penobscot River.

Umbazooksus and Eagle Lake Railroad 
During the winter of 1926–27, Édouard Lacroix's Madawaska Company used log haulers to move heavy railway equipment overland from Lac-Frontière, Quebec to Churchill Depot and then over frozen Churchill Lake and Eagle Lake. The log haulers delivered two steam locomotives, two Plymouth gasoline-powered switchers, miles of steel rail, and sixty railroad cars for carrying pulpwood. Each conveyor could fill a railroad car in 18 minutes. Lacroix completed the Umbazooksus and Eagle Lake Railroad to a pulpwood-unloading trestle at the north end of Umbazooksus Lake.

Great Northern Paper Company accepted Lacroix's railroad on 1 June 1927 and renamed it the Eagle Lake and West Branch Railroad.

Operations
Supplies to operate the railroad arrived from the opposite direction. National railway system deliveries to Greenville, Maine were transported over 45 miles of road, and then across Chesuncook Lake on the side-wheel steamboat A. B. Smith. Great Northern Paper Company built the Chesuncook and Chamberlain Lake Railroad from the steam boat landing at the north end of Chesuncook Lake along the eastern shore of Umbazooksus Lake to the pulpwood unloading pier at the north end of Umbazooksus Lake. Both steam locomotives had been converted to burn oil, so drums of petroleum products to fuel the pulpwood conveyors, switchers and steam locomotives became a major freight commodity over Chesuncook Lake.

Routine operations involved two trains moving ten or twelve loaded pulpwood cars south from Eagle Lake to Umbazooksus Lake, and empty pulpwood cars northward in a round trip taking about 3 hours. The two trains would pass at a midpoint siding. One Plymouth switcher shunted loading cars at Eagle Lake and the other shunted unloading cars at Umbazooksus Lake. The floor of each pulpwood car sloped  to the unloading side; and the slatted side of the car was hinged at the top to swing open when latches were released so the pulpwood would slide out of the car into Umbazooksus Lake. Bark breaking off the pulpwood logs accumulated so the Plymouth switcher periodically dragged a rake adjacent to the pier to keep the water deep enough to float the pulpwood logs being dumped. Normal operations transferred 6,500 cords of pulpwood per week enabling Great Northern Paper Company to manufacture approximately one-fifth of the United States' annual paper production.

Demise
Paper demand declined through the Great Depression until pulpwood transfer ceased in 1933 after the railroad had carried nearly a million cords of pulpwood. The Plymouth switchers found work elsewhere while the steam locomotives waited in the engine house for improved economic conditions. Great Northern found trucks more cost effective than restoring the railroad when business returned following World War II. The trestle gradually collapsed into Chamberlain Lake, but Maine Forest Service employees continued using a motor vehicle over the two miles of track between Eagle Lake and Chamberlain Lake. 

The engine house became a popular snowmobile destination in the 1960s; and fittings like gauges, bells, headlights, and number plates began to disappear from the locomotives before the wooden cab of engine #1 was destroyed when the engine house burned in 1969. The locomotive boiler jackets and asbestos lagging were removed in 1995 but the stripped locomotive shells remain a unique reminder of the industrial revolution in the Maine North Woods.

Locomotives

References

Defunct Maine railroads
North Maine Woods
Penobscot County, Maine
Piscataquis County, Maine
Railway companies established in 1927
Railway companies disestablished in 1933
1927 establishments in Maine
1933 disestablishments in Maine
Allagash River
Penobscot River
American companies established in 1927